Sgula is a moshav in south-central Israel. North of Kiryat Gat, it falls under the jurisdiction of Yoav Regional Council. In  it had a population of 717.

History
The moshav was founded in 1953 by native Israelis on land that had belonged to the Palestinian village of Summeil, which was depopulated in the 1948 Arab–Israeli War. The name may be based on a verse in Exodus (19:5) where the word segula is used in the sense of "special treasure" or jewel: "Now if you obey me fully and keep my covenant, then out of all nations you will be my special treasure (sgula)."

References

Moshavim
Populated places in Southern District (Israel)
Populated places established in 1953
1953 establishments in Israel